Athleta (Athleta) rosavittoriae is a species of sea snail, a marine gastropod mollusk in the family Volutidae, the volutes.

Description 
A. rosavittoriae is white and brown in color. Its shell size grows to be 38–52 millimeters.

Distribution 
This species occurs in the Indian Ocean off Somalia.

References 

 Bail, P & Poppe, G. T. 2001. A conchological iconography: a taxonomic introduction of the recent Volutidae. Hackenheim-Conchbook, 30 pp, 5 pl. (updated October 2008 for WoRMS)

Endemic fauna of Somalia
Volutidae
Gastropods described in 1981